The sixth series (Season 3 on PBS, or Collection 3 on Netflix in the US) of The Great British Bake Off first aired on 5 August 2015, with twelve contestants competing to be the series 6 winner. Mel Giedroyc and Sue Perkins presented the show, and Mary Berry and Paul Hollywood returned as judges. The competition was held in the ground of Welford Park, Berkshire for a second year. The series was won by Nadiya Hussain, with Tamal Ray and Ian Cumming finishing as runners-up.

The sixth series was broadcast as the third season on PBS in the United States.

Bakers

Results summary 

Colour key:

Episodes

Episode 1: Cakes 
For the first challenge, the bakers were given two hours to make a Madeira Cake, which was chosen as an "easy" challenge for the bakers. The cake should have a dome and a crack on top, though Mary stated the cake should not differ too far from the original. For the technical challenge, the bakers had one and three quarter hours to make Mary's recipe for a Frosted Walnut Cake, which should have three layers and a meringue coating, along with caramelised walnuts. A Black Forest Gâteau was set as the final challenge. In three and a half hours, the bakers were tasked with making a cake that should be extravagant, and should "impress" Mary and Paul.

Episode 2: Biscuits 
For the signature challenge, the bakers were given two hours to bake 24 identical biscotti of any shape, flavour or size. In the technical challenge, they were required to make eight arlettes, which are high-end light delicate cinnamon-flavoured biscuits, in two and a half hours. For the show stopper, they were set the challenge of making 36 biscuits, to be presented in a biscuit box made of a different kind of biscuit mix. They were given four hours in this challenge.

Episode 3: Bread 

In the first task, the bakers were given one and a half hour to make two quick bread to be made free-form (i.e. not in a tin). For the second task, Paul set the bakers the challenge of baking four identical crusty baguettes in two and a half hours.  For the final showstopper, the bakers needed to make a 3D bread sculpture in five hours, using three types of dough, and one of them should be filled.

 Paul received the first ever special commendation for his showstopper King of the Jungle.

Episode 4: Desserts 
For the signature challenge, the bakers had 2 hours to make twelve crème brûlées. The brief specified that the custard must be set and that the bakers weren't allowed to use a blowtorch to caramelize the top. For the technical challenge, the bakers had four hours to make a Spanische Windtorte. This dessert had two types of meringue, Swiss and French, designed into a circular box and filled with cream and fruit. Three tiers of sweet cheesecakes were set as the showstopper. The structure must be self-standing, have unique flavors and be completed in four and one half hours.

Episode 5: Alternative Ingredients 
This episode has a theme of using alternatives for ingredients usually used in baking. For the signature bake, the bakers were given the challenge of baking a cake, but without using sugar. They were given two and a half hour for the bake. For the technical bake, the challenge was to make twelve identical gluten-free pita breads in two hours. In the showstopper, the bakers needed to make an ice-cream roll using dairy-free ice-cream. They were given four and a half hours for the bake.

Episode 6: Pastry 
For this week's signature challenge, the bakers had to make a Frangipane tart in two hours, the brief being that it must be open-topped and use shortcrust pastry. In the technical, the bakers had to make 12 Flaounes, a cheese filled pastry made in Cyprus. They had two hours. Vol-au-vents were set as the Showstopper – the bakers had to make two types, all using their own puff pastry – in three hours and forty five minutes.

Episode 7: Victorian 
For the first challenge, the bakers had three hours to make a Raised Game Pie. The pie must have thin Hot water crust pastry, and must be very ornate, as most game pies from the era were. For the technical challenge, a Tennis fruit Cake was set for the bakers. The bakers were given three hours to make a fruit cake, along with royal icing and sugar paste, with much gelatine being used. A Charlotte Russe was set as the Showstopper. To be done in five and a half hours, the bake usually has ladyfingers around jelly and a sponge – with flavour and decoration being key.

Episode 8: Pâtisserie 
In the first quarter-final challenge, the bakers had to make twenty-four cream horns in three and a half hours. They were asked to make twenty four cream horns – twelve of each flavour, using either puff, rough puff or flaky pastry. Mary's recipe for nine Mochatines was set as the technical challenge. These were small, delicate genoise sponges, filled with a coffee buttercream meant to be attractive, as if "in a pâtisserie window". They would only have two hours. Religieuse à l'ancienne were set as the Showstopper challenge. These would be large éclairs, stood upright with no dowelling, and decorated with buttercream. They were given four hours, though the towers were left to stand for two hours afterwards, as traditional religieuse would have been left for such time. As a result, some of the towers began to collapse or lean upon being presented to Mary and Paul.

Episode 9: Chocolate (Semi-final) 
For the first challenge, the bakers had two and a half hours to make a chocolate tart. The tart had to be ornate, intricate, and full of flavour. For the technical, the bakers faced a staggered start, and were each given one hour and fifteen minutes to make a chocolate soufflé – with Flora starting first, followed by Ian, Nadiya, then Tamal. A chocolate centrepiece was set as the showstopper. In four hours, the bakers had to create an ornate centrepiece using white chocolate in some form and including a biscuit element, the centrepiece having to be free-standing and attractive. Flora's elimination meant that she was the first baker to have finished first in the technical challenge and be eliminated the same week.

Episode 10: Final 
In the final signature challenge, the bakers had to make 16 iced buns, of which there must be two kinds, in three hours. In the technical, the judges decided to use one of Paul's recipes; the bakers had to bake six raspberry-flavoured mille-feuille with fondant icing in two hours. The recipe involved pastry – something all of the bakers had struggled with in Week Six. In the final Showstopper, the bakers were given four hours to make a classic British cake in a minimum three-layered presentation.

Masterclasses 
Mary and Paul show how to bake some of their favourite recipes and technical challenges.

Episode 1

Episode 2

Episode 3

Episode 4

Christmas special

Controversies

Betting
As the show was pre-recorded, the winner of the show would have been known by those involved in the show. Bookmaker Ladbrokes halted betting on the show after "a run of bets" was placed for one contestant, many at shops in the Ipswich area.

It was also claimed that dozens of employees of BBC as well as the production company, Love Productions, had opened gambling accounts to place bets on the eventual winner.

Spoilers
In a BBC Radio 2 broadcast, judge Mary Berry accidentally revealed the eliminated contestant prior to the airing of episode three.

Contestants
Contestant Marie Campbell, who was the first Star Baker of the series, was criticised for being "semi-professional", after it emerged that she had been trained in Ecole Escoffier at the Ritz in Paris where she specialised in patisserie. A statement from the BBC said: "There are strict criteria to take part in the show and Marie met those criteria. She gained a certificate for one week’s training in Paris in 1984, more than 10 years ago. She has not worked professionally as a baker or chef."

Post-show career

Nadiya Hussain regularly appears on The One Show on BBC1. Her own cookery show, The Chronicles of Nadiya started on 24 August 2016 on BBC One. Hussain writes a weekly column for The Times Magazine, a part of the Saturday supplement of The Times, as well as a monthly column in Essentials magazine. Her recipes have also appeared in BBC's Good Food magazine.

Hussain was signed by UK publisher Michael Joseph, part of Penguin Random House, for her debut book Nadiya's Kitchen, which is a collection of the recipes that she cooks for friends and family. Hussain has written a children's book of stories and recipes, Bake Me A Story, due to be published by Hodder Children's Books, which blends updated versions of fairytales (poor "Sleepless Beauty" just needs a nice cup of cardamom-infused hot chocolate to break her curse; resourceful Jack wins the giant over with yummy bean patties) with colourful illustrations and child-friendly recipes. She is also writing three contemporary women's fiction novels for Harlequin.

Tamal Ray writes a monthly column for The Guardian.  He presented a television show on health on Channel 4 titled Be Your Own Doctor.

Flora Shedden studied for a year at the University of Edinburgh but deferred on a course on art history at the University of St Andrews for a year to concentrate on writing a cookbook, Gatherings, published in January 2017. She wrote a column on baking for The Scotsman.

Ratings
According to the overnight ratings, the opening episode of the series 6 of Bake Off was watched by 9.3 million viewers, a rise of over 2 million from the previous year. The final was watched by an overnight audience of 13.4 million viewers peaking at 14.5, the highest overnight total of 2015. The list of ten most-watched television programmes of 2015 was also dominated by The Great British Bake Off, with seven of the year's ten being episodes of The Great British Bake Off.

Official episode viewing figures are from BARB.

Specials

References

External links
 

Series 6
2015 British television seasons